Pherbecta is a genus of marsh flies (insects in the family Sciomyzidae). There is at least one described species in Pherbecta, P. limenitis.

References

Further reading

External links

 

Sciomyzidae
Sciomyzoidea genera